The following radio stations broadcast on FM frequency 92.9 MHz:

Argentina
 Activa in Rosario, Santa Fe
 Carrodilla in Carrodilla, Mendoza
 La Red in Presidencia Roque Sáenz Peña, Chaco
 Pacífico in Salta
 Peregrina in Buenos Aires
 Radio María in Lincoln, Buenos Aires
 Radio María in Comodoro Rivadavia, Chubut
 Radio María in Bella Vista, Corrientes
 Radio María in Chilecito, La Rioja
 Radio María in Monteros, Tucumán
 Radio María in Sierra Grande, Río Negro
 Red de la costa in Santa Clara del Mar, Buenos Aires
 Soft in Catamarca
 Universidad in Santiago del Estero
 UNJu in San Salvador de Jujuy, Jujuy

Australia
 92.9 FM Tamworth  in Tamworth
 ABC Classic FM in Sydney
 92.9 Voice of the Family in Toowoomba
 Triple J in Hobart
 Triple M Perth
 Triple J in Albany

Honduras 

 Estereo Clase 92.9 FM San Pedro Sula, Cortés, Honduras
 Estereo Clase 92.9 FM Puerto Cortés, Cortés, Honduras

Canada (Channel 225)
 CBBK-FM in Kingston, Ontario
 CBFA-FM-2 in Obedjiwan, Quebec
 CBTR-FM in Roddickton, Newfoundland and Labrador
 CBX-1-FM in Bonnyville, Alberta
 CBYE-FM in Logan Lake, British Columbia
 CFCO-1-FM in Chatham, Ontario
 CFEX-FM in Calgary, Alberta
 CFLT-FM in Dartmouth, Nova Scotia
 CFSH-FM in Apsley, Ontario
 CFWJ-FM in Sault Ste. Marie, Ontario
 CHTG-FM in Haldimand, Ontario
 CHYK-FM-3 in Hearst, Ontario
 CIBW-FM in Drayton Valley, Alberta
 CINR-FM in Norway House, Manitoba
 CJFW-FM-1 in Kitimat, British Columbia
 CJFW-FM-3 in Sandspit, British Columbia
 CJFW-FM-4 in Masset, British Columbia
 CJFW-FM-5 in Burns Lake, British Columbia
 CJFW-FM-6 in Smithers, British Columbia
 CJLR-FM-5 in Yorkton, Saskatchewan
 CKBL-FM in Saskatoon, Saskatchewan
 CKIC-FM in Winnipeg, Manitoba
 CKLE-FM in Bathurst, New Brunswick
 CKSB-1-FM in Ste-Rose-du-Lac, Manitoba
 VF2001 in La Ronge, Saskatchewan
 VF2006 in Boston Bar, British Columbia
 VF2282 in Kitwanga, British Columbia
 VF2496 in Stewart, British Columbia
 VF2507 in Creston, British Columbia
 VF2515 in Nakusp, British Columbia

China 
 CNR The Voice of China in Liaoyang

Japan
 JOSF in Nagoya, Aichi

Malaysia
 Hitz in Klang Valley and Eastern Pahang
 Radio Klasik in Kuching, Sarawak
 Sabah FM in Sandakan, Sabah
 TraXX FM in Eastern Johor

Mexico
XEQ-FM in Mexico City
XHBTA-FM in Bahía de Tortugas, Baja California Sur
XHCDU-FM in Ciudad Acuña, Coahuila
XHCRR-FM in Santiago Zoquiapan (Cerro Corral de Piedras), Oaxaca

XHECD-FM in Puebla, Puebla
XHENZ-FM in Culiacán, Sinaloa
XHER-FM in Ciudad Cuauhtémoc, Chihuahua
XHERG-FM in Ojo de Agua-Guadalupe, Nuevo León
XHFAC-FM in Salvatierra, Guanajuato
XHFZO-FM in Ensenada, Baja California
XHGON-FM in Ciudad Obregón, Sonora
XHJH-FM in Xalapa, Veracruz
XHJZ-FM in Ciudad Jiménez, Chihuahua
XHMZO-FM in Manzanillo, Colima
XHSLC-FM in Salina Cruz, Oaxaca
XHTXO-FM in Taxco, Guerrero
XHUNES-FM in Durango, Durango
XHYUC-FM in Mérida, Yucatán
XHZE-FM in Santiago Ixcuintla, Nayarit

Philippines 
 DYRU in Kalibo, Aklan
 DXWB in Valencia, Bukidnon

United States (Channel 225)
  in Flagstaff, Arizona
 KAMP-LP in St. Michael, Alaska
  in Dubuque, Iowa
 KAYN-LP in Bay City, Oregon
  in Tulsa, Oklahoma
  in Logan, Utah
  in Toppenish, Washington
  in San Angelo, Texas
  in Coos Bay, Oregon
 KDWR-LP in Desert Ridge, Arizona
 KEZQ in West Yellowstone, Montana
 KFAT (FM) in Anchorage, Alaska
  in Healdsburg, California
  in Rochester, Minnesota
  in Visalia, California
 KGPJ-LP in Grand Prairie, Texas
 KGRC in Hannibal, Missouri
 KHKF in Island City, Oregon
  in Jennings, Louisiana
 KHUD in Tucson, Arizona
 KISM in Bellingham, Washington
 KJCD-LP in Pine Ridge, South Dakota
  in Montecito, California
 KKBQ in Pasadena, Texas
 KKIA (FM) in Ida Grove, Iowa
  in Salem, Missouri
  in Saint Joseph, Minnesota
 KKPK in Colorado Springs, Colorado
  in Grand Forks, North Dakota
  in Great Falls, Montana
  in Buffalo, Wyoming
  in Reno, Nevada
  in Malden, Missouri
 KMML in Cimarron, Kansas
  in Osage City, Kansas
  in Socorro, New Mexico
  in Wichita Falls, Texas
  in Willard, Missouri
 KOUO-LP in Orderville, Utah
 KPAW in Warren AFB, Wyoming
 KPTE in Bayfield, Colorado
 KPUT in Mona, Utah
 KQRP-LP in Malakoff, Texas
 KRMX in Marlin, Texas
 KROM in San Antonio, Texas
 KRWH-LP in Sioux Falls, South Dakota
 KSCG-LP in Campbell, Texas
  in Silver City, New Mexico
  in Watertown, South Dakota
 KSNZ in Shamrock, Texas
 KSPH in Springhill, Louisiana
  in Beatrice, Nebraska
  in Artesia, New Mexico
 KUZU-LP in Denton, Texas
  in Hot Springs Village, Arkansas
 KVTZ-LP in Breaux Bridge, Louisiana
 KWRH-LP in Webster Groves, Missouri
 KXES-LP in Galena, Alaska
  in Sun City, California
  in Espanola, New Mexico
 KYFE-LP in Bentonville, Arkansas
 KYWS-LP in West Sacramento, California
 KYYE-LP in Garland, Texas
  in Bismarck, North Dakota
  in Spokane, Washington
 WAAC (FM) in Valdosta, Georgia
  in Mobile, Alabama
 WBOS in Brookline, Massachusetts
 WBOX-FM in Varnado, Louisiana
  in Saugerties, New York
  in Buffalo, New York
 WCWV in Summersville, West Virginia
 WDCM-LP in Defiance, Ohio
 WDUP-LP in New London, Connecticut
  in Hazlehurst, Mississippi
 WECL in Lake Hallie, Wisconsin
 WEGX in Dillon, South Carolina
  in Manorville, New York
 WEMK-LP in Upper Gwynedd, Pennsylvania
  in Burlington, Vermont
  in Bangor, Maine
 WGGT-LP in Philadelphia, Pennsylvania
 WGPG-LP in Battle Creek, Michigan
  in Eaton, Ohio
  in Charlotte Harbor, Florida
  in Nashville, Tennessee
  in Cadillac, Michigan
 WKZY in Chilton, Wisconsin
 WLMI in Grand Ledge, Michigan
 WLTJ in Pittsburgh, Pennsylvania
  in Ocala, Florida
 WMFS-FM in Bartlett, Tennessee
  in Wilkes-Barre, Pennsylvania
  in South Bend, Indiana
 WNUZ-LP in Gap, Pennsylvania
 WOOM-LP in Philadelphia, Pennsylvania
 WPPS-LP in Oconto Falls, Wisconsin
 WQKA-LP in Pulteney, New York
  in Smyrna, Delaware
 WRGU-LP in Philadelphia, Pennsylvania
 WRLG-LP in Philadelphia, Pennsylvania
 WRPW in Colfax, Illinois
  in Duluth, Minnesota
  in Olney, Illinois
 WSEQ-LP in Hudson, North Carolina
  in Veedersburg, Indiana
  in Aguadilla, Puerto Rico
  in Northport, Alabama
 WTWV-FM in Suffolk, Virginia
  in Farmville, Virginia
 WVLK-FM in Lexington, Kentucky
 WXCS-LP in Cambridge Springs, Pennsylvania
 WXDC in Berkeley Springs, West Virginia
 WYBO in Waynesboro, Georgia
 WYNW in Birnamwood, Wisconsin
  in Naguabo, Puerto Rico
 WZAY-LP in Rockledge, Florida
 WZGC in Atlanta, Georgia
  in Abbeville, South Carolina
 WZML-LP in Bryn Mawr, Pennsylvania

References

Lists of radio stations by frequency